Just Marvaless is an EP by rapper Marvaless, released on January 24, 1995.  It peaked at number 71 on the Billboard Top R&B/Hip-Hop Albums.

Track listing 
 "Just Marvaless" — 3:20
 "That's How We Creep" (featuring Pizzo) — 4:24
 "Ride With Me" — 4:34
 "Hard Core" (featuring C-Bo & Pizzo) — 4:43
 "Jealous Bitches" — 4:17

Personnel 
 DJ Daryl – Producer (tracks: 2, 3, 5)
 Mike Mosley – Producer (tracks: 1, 4)
 Ken Lee – Engineer
 Tony Smith – Photography
 Phunky Phat Graph-X – Artwork, design

References

External links 
 Just Marvaless at Discogs
 Just Marvaless at CD Universe
 Just Marvaless at Amazon.com

1995 albums
Marvaless albums
Gangsta rap EPs